Wolfgang W. Wurster (7 July 1937 - 29 December 2003) was a German researcher in the fields of architecture and archaeology.

Wolfgang Wurster was born in Aalen, Germany. He studied architecture at the TU München. He undertook additional studies in art history and American history, in the United States and Spain. In 1963 he received his Diplom from his German university. From this point on, he concentrated on excavation methodology, CRM, and the history of architecture. In 1971, he obtained a doctorate of engineering, his dissertation being Der dorische Peripteraltempel auf dem Kolonnahügel in Aegina. In addition to holding academic positions in Munich, he also was a faculty member of the Universität Darmstadt. He did field work in the Mediterranean and South American (Ecuador and Peru).

His book Die Schatz-Gräber. Archäologische Expeditionen durch die Hochkulturen Südamerikas (1991) brought him the Rheinisches Landesmuseum Bonn's Ceram-Preis for the best book of archeology.

Publications 
 Alt-Ägina. Band 1: Der Apollontempel, von Zabern, Mainz 1974
 Die Schatz-Gräber. Archäologische Expeditionen durch die Hochkulturen Südamerikas, GEO, Hamburg 1991

About Wurster 
 Burkhart Vogt: Wolfgang W. Wurster † (7 July 1937 – 29 December 2003), In: Bericht über die 42. Tagung für Ausgrabungswissenschaft und Bauforschung, Habelt, Bonn 2004
 Klaus Dornisch: Einem Freund zur Erinnerung. Wolfgang W. Wurster in memoriam, In Nürnberger Blätter zur Archäologie 20 (2004), S. 198-200

External links 
 

Technical University of Munich alumni
Archaeologists from Baden-Württemberg
1937 births
2003 deaths
People from Aalen